Tecno Camon 18, Tecno Camon 18P and Tecno Camon 18 Premier are Android-based smartphones manufactured, released and marketed by Tecno Mobile as part of Tecno Camon 18 series. The devices were unveiled during an event held on 6 October 2021 as successors to Tecno Camon 17 series.

The Camon 18, Camon 18P and Camon 18 Premier is an upgraded version of Camon 17 series, coming with different features, including the processor, display, camera, design and storage. The phone has received generally favorable reviews, with critics mostly noting the bigger battery and fast charging capacity.

Specifications

Hardware
The Camon 18 and Camon 18P features a 1080p resolution with an 20.5:9 aspect ratio, while the Camon 18 Premier feature a 1080p resolution with an 20.9 ratio. Camon 18 and Camon 18P features a display size of 6.8-inches, while the Camon 18 Premier feature a display size of 6.7-inches. Camon 18 comes with a MediaTek Helio G88 SoC, while the Camon 18P and Camon 18 Premier comes with MediaTek Helio G96 SoC. The Camon 18 comes with 4 GB of RAM, while the Camon 18P and Camon 18 Premier comes with 8 GB of RAM. Camon 18 and Camon 18P comes with 128 GB storage, while Camon 18 Premier comes with 256 GB storage. All of the device feature the ability to use a microSD. Camon 18 and Camon 18P comes with the battery capacity of 5000 mAh, while the Camon 18 Premier comes with the battery capacity of 4750 mAh. The Camon 18 supports fast charging of 18 watt, while the Camon 18P and Camon 18 Premier supports fast charging of 33 watt. Camon 18 feature a dual rear camera with a 48-megapixel main camera, 2-megapixel macro and 2-megapixel depth, it feature a 16-megapixel front camera. The Camon 18P feature a quad camera with a 48-megapixel main camera, 13-megapixel telephoto and 2-megapixel depth, it feature a 16-megapixel front camera. The Camon 18 Premier feature a quad camera with a 64-megapixel main camera, 8-megapixel periscope telephoto camera and 12-megapixel gimbal OIS, it feature a 48-megapixel front camera. Camon 18 Premier has the ability to shoot 4K content at 30fps and 1080p at 30fps.

Software
The device ship with Android 11 with HiOS 8.0. The HiOS 8.0 features Za-Hooc 2.0, Voice changer, Video editor, Document correction and Phone cloner.

Reception 
Jbklutse.com gave a positive review of the Camon 18 Premier. Praise was directed towards the camera, performance and display, while noting that "the Tecno Camon 18 Premier is more than a decent phone of the mid-range budget with great cameras with incredible functions, an impressive display and refresh rate with lag-less gaming experience all powered by a 4750mAH battery".

George Kamau from Techweez gave a positive review of the Camon 18. He said "The TECNO Camon 18 is a really great package and nails the fundamentals – nice design, high quality and high refresh rate display, reliable performance, upgraded internals, dependable cameras, and impressive battery life".

References 

Android (operating system) devices
Tecno smartphones
Mobile phones introduced in 2021